Aydındere is a belde (town) in Giresun Province, Turkey.

Geography 
Aydındere is a town in Bulancak district of Giresun Province. Although geographically a town of Black Sea Region, at   it is situated in the mountainous area far from the coast. The population of Aydındere was 2607  as of 2013.

History
Prior to 14th century, Aydındere was a Byzantine village. In 1380 it was captured by Eretna Beylik, a beylik (principality) in Central Anatolia. In the 15th century it was annexed to the Ottoman Empire. During the Turkish Republic era there were two villages instead of Aydındere.  One village named Kızılev (red house) and the other Derecikalan (region of the creek) . In 1987 Kızılev was renamed as Aydınlar. In 1999 the two villages were merged to form a town and the town was named as Aydındere.

Economy 
The most important crop of the town is hazelnut. Potato is also produced . Beehiving is another economic sector. But, carpet weaving, once popular, has declined.

References

Populated places in Giresun Province
Towns in Turkey
Bulancak District